Nicolae Mihăilescu (born 28 November 1965) is a Romanian former fencer. He competed in the team épée event at the 1992 Summer Olympics.

References

External links
 

1965 births
Living people
Romanian male fencers
Romanian épée fencers
Olympic fencers of Romania
Fencers at the 1992 Summer Olympics
20th-century Romanian people
21st-century Romanian people